Germán Ohm Gómez (born 28 May 1936) was a Mexican professional boxer of German ancestry.

Professional career
In October 1956, he beat the future world bantamweight champion José Becerra. One of his biggest wins was an upset victory over an undefeated Carlos Cardoso.

His last fight ever was a win over Memo Diez in Matamoros, Tamaulipas, Mexico.

Legacy
German turned pro when he was eighteen years old and retired less than two months after his twenty-second birthday. He never made a comeback in boxing, but is still considered one of the best Bantamweight's in the history of boxing.

References

External links

Boxers from Mexico City
Super-featherweight boxers
1936 births
Living people
Mexican people of German descent
Mexican male boxers